Fortuna a.k.a. Seduced in Sodom a.k.a. The Girl from the Dead Sea a 1966 film directed by Menahem Golan. It was released in the United States in 1969 in a dubbed version.

Plot

A man falls in love with a beautiful girl who leads him down the wrong path.  He must decide what to do with life and is not sure he can continue living and contemplates suicide.

Principal cast

Availability
Although the film is hard to find, some websites do sell the DVD online.

References

External links

1966 films
Films directed by Menahem Golan
1960s Hebrew-language films
Israeli drama films
Films produced by Menahem Golan
Films with screenplays by Menahem Golan
Films produced by Yoram Globus